Benjamin W. Perkins Jr. (born March 10, 1956, in Camden, New Jersey) is an American trainer of Thoroughbred racehorses. A graduate of the University of Pennsylvania's Wharton School of Business, he is the son of Benjamin W. Perkins who conditioned racehorses for close to fifty years.

In 1981, Perkins won his first race at Atlantic City Race Course.

References

1956 births
Living people
Wharton School of the University of Pennsylvania alumni
American horse trainers
Sportspeople from Camden, New Jersey